The Super SmartJoy is a device that allows Super NES controllers to be used with a computer. The device was announced on April 20, 2004. This device has a USB port for connecting to both Windows PCs and Macs. SmartJoy is the manufacturer of this peripheral.

Multiple devices can be used on one computer for multiplayer gaming.

References

External links
SmartJoy company website
Super RetroPort (Competing product)

Unlicensed Nintendo hardware
Super Nintendo Entertainment System accessories